The 1994–95 Magyar Kupa (English: Hungarian Cup) was the 55th season of Hungary's annual knock-out cup football competition.

Quarter-finals

|}

Semi-finals

|}

Final

See also
 1994–95 Nemzeti Bajnokság I

References

External links
 Official site 
 soccerway.com

1994–95 in Hungarian football
1994–95 domestic association football cups
1994-95